Britt Lindeborg (22 March 1928 – 5 August 1998) was a Swedish lyricist.

She was born in Solna Municipality to Gunnar Karlsson and Elsa Sparring. Her greatest success was probably "Lyckliga gatan", a Swedish version of "Il ragazzo della via Gluck", performed by Anna-Lena Löfgren. She wrote the lyrics for "Judy, min vän", Swedish contribution to the Eurovision Song Contest 1969, and she wrote the lyrics for "Diggi-Loo Diggi-Ley", winner of the Eurovision Song Contest 1984. Lindeborg also wrote the Swedish lyrics for the Lynsey de Paul composed songs "Taste Me" ("Låt dina sinnen få smaka") and "My Man and Me" ("Min man och jag"), both recorded by Agneta Munther. She was inducted into the Swedish Music Hall of Fame in 2017.

References

1928 births
1998 deaths
People from Solna Municipality
Swedish songwriters
20th-century Swedish women writers